Salma Tarik Mohamed Abdelmotaleb Ahmed (born 22 November 1989) is an Egyptian international footballer who plays as a midfielder for the Egypt women's national football team. At the club level, she played for Smouha in Egypt.

Early life and education 
Born in Cairo, Egypt, Tarik immigrated to the United States when she turned six. She began college at California State University Northridge. She then graduated from Hofstra University in Long Island, New York. She has twin older brothers and one younger brother.

Playing career

College 
Tarik started her college career at California State University Northridge in 2007. She was a starting player in 17 out of 18 games, and made 3 goals during this year.

She then transferred to Hofstra University, where she played from 2008 to 2012. In her first year she played in every game, and tied for the most goals scored on her team. In 2009, she led her team in goals scored at 10 goals. By the time she graduated, she was the third highest scoring player in all of Hofstra history.

International 
Tarik played for the Egypt women's national football team beginning in 2008. She played for the team during World Cup qualifying matches. She took part in Egypt's second ever appearance in the African Cup of Nations scoring in Egypt's milestone win over Zimbabwe, the country's first ever win in the competition.

References

External links
 Hofstra bio

1989 births
Living people
Egyptian women's footballers
Egypt women's international footballers
Footballers from Cairo
Women's association football midfielders
Hofstra Pride women's soccer players
Cal State Northridge Matadors women's soccer players